The brown-banded water snake (Helicops angulatus)  is a species of aquatic snake found in tropical South America and Trinidad and Tobago. It is also known as the water mapepire.

Description
The brown-banded water snake grows to a maximum total length (including tail) of 78 cm (31 inches). Dorsally, it is olive or gray-brown, with dark brown, black-edged crossbands, which narrow at the sides, and are usually confluent with the black crossbands of the belly. There is a large dark rhomboid on the nape. Ventrally, it is yellowish (in alcohol) with black crossbands or black spots.

The dorsal scales are strongly keeled, even on the occiput and nape, and are arranged in 19 rows. Ventrals are 102–130 in number, the anal scale is divided, and the 61-94 subcaudals are paired and keeled.

Habitat and diet
H. angulatus lives in fresh and brackish water, where it feeds on fish (such as freshwater eels) and possibly also frogs and their eggs, tadpoles, lizards, earthworms, and carrion.

Reproduction
H. angulatus has been reported to be "facultatively viviparous".

Venom 
H. angulatus is a non-front-fanged colubroid (NFFC), venomous snake, its venom causes rapid death in mice with an injection of 0.4 mg/kg (intraperitoneally).
There is an urgent need for training of the medical team in the snake identification, clinical management of snakebite, and the existence of a human-snake conflict involving NFFC species in Bolivia.

References

Further reading
 
Freiberg, M.A. 1982. Snakes of South America. Hong Kong: T.F.H. Publications.189 pp. . (Helicops angulatus, p. 99).
Linnaeus, C. 1758. Systema naturæ per regna tria naturæ, secundum classes, ordines, genera, species, cum characteribus, differentiis, synonymis, locis. Tomus I. Editio Decima, Reformata. Stockholm: L. Salvius. 824 pp. (Coluber angulatus, new species, p. 217). (in Latin).

External links
 

Helicops
Reptiles of Trinidad and Tobago
Vertebrates of Guyana
Reptiles of South America
Reptiles described in 1758
Taxa named by Carl Linnaeus